Steinfalk (German: Stone Halcon) (elevation ) is a summit in the Falken Group, a subgroup of the Karwendel range in the Austrian state of Tyrol.

Alpinism 
The Steinfalk can be reached from the Eng Valley passing the Falken Hut (Falkenhütte) as an alpine hike with some climbing parts (UIAA I). It is the only peak in the Falken Group with relatively easy access (except normal alpine hike to Mahnkopf).

Mountains of the Alps
Two-thousanders of Austria
Mountains of Tyrol (state)